Yann de Fabrique (his full name is Yann de Fabrique Saint-Tours), born on 7 July 1973, is a French former swimmer who competed in the 1992 Summer Olympics and in the 1996 Summer Olympics.  He specialized in both the Freestyle and Butterfly events on the International scene where he represented France for a decade from 1992 to 2001.

In addition to swimming in two Olympic Games, he swam at the 1994 World Swimming Championship in Rome, Italy and three European Swimming Championships (Sheffield 1993, Istanbul 1999 and Helsinki 2000) - winning a Bronze Medal in the 4x200 Freestyle Relay in Sheffield, England.  He also represented France in the 1993 Buffalo, 1995 Fukuoka and 1997 Sicily editions of the World University Games with a culmination of eight medals - two Gold, four Silver and two Bronze Medals.

His parents were both born in Martinique (FWI).

References

1973 births
Living people
French male butterfly swimmers
French male freestyle swimmers
Olympic swimmers of France
Swimmers at the 1992 Summer Olympics
Swimmers at the 1996 Summer Olympics
European Aquatics Championships medalists in swimming
Universiade medalists in swimming
Universiade gold medalists for France
Universiade silver medalists for France
Medalists at the 1993 Summer Universiade
Medalists at the 1995 Summer Universiade
20th-century French people
21st-century French people